Thomas Russell (born 1929) is a Canadian retired ice hockey player with the Sudbury Wolves. He won a silver medal at the 1949 World Ice Hockey Championships in Stockholm, Sweden. He also played with the Ayr Raiders in Scotland.

References

1929 births
Living people
Canadian ice hockey centres
Ice hockey people from Ontario